The 2009 AFC Beach Soccer Championship was a qualifying tournament held during 7 November – 11, 2009 in Dubai, United Arab Emirates that determined which two participants will represent the AFC region at the 2009 FIFA Beach Soccer World Cup.

Participating teams

Format
The seven nation tournament consisted of two groups. The teams played each other once in their group during the group stage. The top two teams in each group advanced to the semifinals. The semifinal winners qualified for the 2009 FIFA Beach Soccer World Cup.

Group stage

Group A

Group B

Knockout stage

1–1 aet(2–1) pen

Winners

Qualified Teams

Final standing

AFC Championship
Beach Soccer Championship
AFC Beach Soccer Championship
International association football competitions hosted by the United Arab Emirates
Beach
2009 in beach soccer